On 3 August 2013, the Indian consulate in Jalalabad, Afghanistan was attacked by three suicide bombers. Afghan security forces spotted the attackers as they approached the consulate in a car leading to one of the attackers detonating his explosives. The blast killed nine people, six of them children, and wounded 24 others.

References

2013 murders in Afghanistan
Attacks on diplomatic missions in Afghanistan
Attacks on diplomatic missions of India
Terrorist incidents in Afghanistan in 2013
Jalalabad
Suicide bombings in Afghanistan
Mass murder in Afghanistan
Mass murder in 2013
August 2013 events in Afghanistan
Afghanistan–India relations
Attacks in Afghanistan in 2013